Swissquote Group Holding SA is a Swiss banking group specialising in providing online financial and trading services. The Group's shares have been listed on the SIX Swiss Exchange under the ticker symbol “SQN” since 29 May 2000. The Group's headquarters are located in Gland, Switzerland. The Group has 1040 employees as of December 2022.

Areas of activity 
Swissquote Bank SA allows private persons to trade equities, funds, bonds, warrants, options and futures. The bank also offers services designed specifically for asset managers and corporate clients. In addition, the bank offers an electronic asset management tool, ePrivate Banking, as well as traditional banking services, including mortgages, savings accounts and more specialised transactions, such as currency trading (forex) and cryptocurrencies (35 pairs as of December 2022).

History
In 1990, Marc Bürki and Paolo Buzzi set up Marvel Communication SA. This company, which specialised in financial software applications, was the forerunner of what was to later become Swissquote.

Foundation and going public
The financial platform Swissquote was founded in 1996. It enables private investors to access the prices of all the securities traded on the Swiss exchange free of charge and in real time. On 29 May 2000, Swissquote shares were floated on the SIX Swiss Exchange. The company obtained its banking license in the same year.

Acquisitions
In 2010, two acquisitions enabled Swissquote to consolidate its position as a leader in online trading. In June the company took over the Zurich-based company Tradejet AG, an online information platform and broker, and then took over ACM Advanced Currency Markets AG in October. The latter acquisition meant that the company's trading business then included online Forex dealing.

In September 2013, Swissquote secured a place in the international market by acquiring and merging with MIG Bank, a company specialising in Forex. This acquisition propelled Swissquote, which aspired to become a major player in the currency market, into the top ten online currency trading service providers.

In January 2015, following the Swiss National Bank's decision to discontinue the minimum exchange rate of 1.20 CHF per euro, Swissquote set aside a reserve of 25 million Swiss francs without, however, compromising the profitability or the soundness of the bank.

In August 2018, Swissquote acquired the Luxembourg-based Internaxx Bank SA to gain unrestricted access to the European market. Following regulatory approval by the European Central Bank and the CSSF in Luxembourg, the company was renamed Swissquote Bank Europe SA and is now a fully owned entity of the Swissquote Group.

Partnerships 
Swissquote has been the official partner of the British football club Manchester United since 26 January 2015. At national level, Swissquote has also formed a partnership with PostFinance. Swissquote also forms a partnership with the Basellandschaftliche Kantonalbank for online mortgages.

References 

Canton of Vaud
Banks established in 2000
Financial services companies of Switzerland
Companies listed on the SIX Swiss Exchange